Chilo perfusalis is a moth in the family Crambidae. It was described by George Hampson in 1919. It is found in Nigeria.

References

Endemic fauna of Nigeria
Chiloini
Moths described in 1919